The Dove & The Wolf are an American folk pop duo from Paris, France, now based in Philadelphia, Pennsylvania.

History
The duo began in 2012, releasing a self-titled EP. Two years later, the duo moved to Philadelphia and released a second EP titled The Words You Said. In 2017, The Dove & The Wolf signed to Fat Possum Records and released their third EP titled I Don't Know What To Feel. The duo released their first full-length album, Conversations, in 2019.

Band members
Paloma Gil
Louise Hayat-Camard

Discography
Studio albums
Conversations (2019)
EPs
EP (2012)
The Words You Said (2014)
I Don't Know What To Feel (2017)

References

Musical groups from Paris
Fat Possum Records artists